The list of ship launches in 1673 includes a chronological list of some ships launched in 1673.


References

1673
Ship launches